The general speed limits in Morocco are:

60 km/h  within urban areas.

100 km/h outside urban areas including expressways (voie express).

120 km/h on highways (Autoroute).

Morocco
Transport in Morocco